The 1986 Hall of Fame Tennis Championships, also known as the 1986 Volvo Tennis Hall of Fame Championships for sponsorship reasons, was a men's tennis tournament played on outdoor grass courts and part of the Nabisco Grand Prix circuit. held. It was the 11th edition of the tournament and was held at the International Tennis Hall of Fame in Newport, Rhode Island, USA from July 7 through July 13, 1986. Unseeded Bill Scanlon won the singles title and $20,000 first prize money.

Finals

Singles
 Bill Scanlon defeated  Tim Wilkison 7–5, 6–4
 It was Scanlon's 1st singles title of the year and the 6th and last of his career.

Doubles
 Vijay Amritraj /  Tim Wilkison defeated  Eddie Edwards /  Francisco González 4–6, 7–5, 7–6

References

External links
 
 ATP tournament profile

Hall Of Fame Tennis Championships, 1986
Hall of Fame Tennis Championships
Tennis tournaments in Rhode Island
Hall of Fame Tennis Championships
Hall of Fame Tennis Championships